Corgarff is a hamlet in Aberdeenshire, Scotland in the Grampian Mountains. The nearby Corgarff Castle was used as a military barracks in the 18th century. The hamlet's primary school closed in 1998.

Flora and Fauna

Most of the heather moors around Corgarff are managed for grouse. Narrow strips of heather, Ideally about half an hectare, are burned on a 7-10 year cycle creating a distinctive mosaic pattern on the hills. The burnt heather quickly sprouts forming fresh young shoots, the main food for the red grouse. The taller heather offers the grouse nesting sites and protection from predators such as foxes and carrion crow. 

The mountain hare is a feature of the moorlands of Scotland, Its white coat in winter making it very distinctive on land without snow. In summer there is a blue tinge to its coat, hence its alternative name, the blue hare.  The farmland around the River Don provides a breeding ground for waders such as redshank and lapwing. The redshank can be identified by its red legs. In flight it has a white triangular rump patch and white triangles on the tailing edges of the wings. The hysterical calls of the redshank at the approach of man has earned it the name "sentinel of the marshes". Lapwing are easily recognisable by their long crests, black and white under-markings and loud pee-wit call.

Orchids are present around Corgarff. between June and July, the pale lilac flowers of the heath-spotted orchid can be seen. The distinctive spotted leaves make this orchid easy to identify.

Footnotes

Villages in Aberdeenshire